The Tyrone Area School District is a public school district with coverage areas in Blair County, Pennsylvania, Huntingdon County, Pennsylvania and Taylor Township in Centre County, Pennsylvania. It serves the borough of Tyrone and the townships of Tyrone and Snyder in Blair County, as well as the borough of Birmingham and the townships of Warriors Mark and Franklin in Huntingdon County. The district encompasses approximately 167 square miles. Based on 2010 local census data, it serves a resident population of 12,581.

Schools

 Tyrone Area Elementary School – (Grades Pre-K-4)601 Clay Ave. Tyrone, Pennsylvania 16686
 Tyrone Area Middle School – (Grades 5–8)1001 Clay Ave. Tyrone, Pennsylvania 16686
 Tyrone Area High School – (Grades 9–12)1001 Clay Ave. Tyrone, Pennsylvania 16686

Extracurriculars
The district offers a variety of clubs, activities and sports.

Athletics

Boys
Baseball - AAA
Basketball- AAAA
Cross Country - AA
Football - AAA
Golf -AA
Soccer - AA with Bellwood-Antis School District
Swimming and Diving - Class AA
Tennis - AA
Track and Field
Wrestling	 - AAA

Girls
Basketball - AAA
Cross Country  - AA
Soccer (Fall) - A with Bellwood-Antis School District
Swimming and Diving - Class AA
Softball - AAA
Tennis - AAA
Track and Field - AA
Volleyball - AA

Junior High School Sports

Boys
Basketball
Football
Track and Field
Wrestling	

Girls
Basketball
Softball 
Track and Field

According to PIAA directory July 2012

References

External links
 Tyrone Area School District
 PIAA Pennsylvania Interscholastic Athletic Association
 Appalachia Intermediate Unit 8
 Greater Altoona Career & Technology Center

School districts in Blair County, Pennsylvania
School districts in Huntingdon County, Pennsylvania
School districts in Centre County, Pennsylvania